Luh Ketut Suryani (born August 24, 1944) is the head of Psychiatry at Udayana University. She has written widely on topics ranging from meditation to   Balinese culture. She is an advocate against pedophilia and is the founder of the Committee Against Sexual Abuse (CASA), an NGO based in Jakarta.

See also 
  Sex tourism in Indonesia

References

External links
The Balinese People: A Reinvestigation of Character. – The Journal of Asian Studies, Vol. 52, No. 4. (Nov., 1993), pp. 1087–1088.
Those Who Chose And Who Has The Call – Anand Ashram
Child sex tourists taking advantage of post-bombing Bali poverty ABC – 10 October 2003

1944 births
Udayana University alumni
Indonesian educators
Indonesian women educators
Balinese people
Indonesian Hindus
Living people